Bennett Coe Russell (May 12, 1944 – December 15, 1999) was an American football quarterback who played 1 game in the American Football League (AFL), for the Buffalo Bills.

References

1944 births
People from Brewton, Alabama
American football quarterbacks
Louisville Cardinals football players
Buffalo Bills players
1999 deaths